Mohammad Mostafa Kamal Raz is a Bangladeshi television and film director and screenwriter. He is best known for his directorial debut Projapoti (2011), which was produced by Enayetur Rahman Bappy and under the banner of NTV Production House. Main star cast of the film was Moushumi, Zahid Hasan, Mosharraf Karim and the film won three National Film Awards for Best Music Director, Best Lyricist & Best Singer (Female) and also best known for his other films Chaya Chobi, Taarkata and Samraat. He is also well known for being an assistant director under the film director and TVC maker Mostofa Sarwar Farooki.

Works 
He directed five movies in his film career which was started by Projapoti (2011). After that, he did Chaya Chobi (2012), which is still unreleased. In 2014 he directed Taarkata Bangladesh got a huge response from young audiences of Bangladesh. Samraat: The King Is Here was his another hit movie in 2016. He is now busy in post-production level of a romantic movie. He directed a brand new movie in 2019. Name of the movie Jodi Ekdin is starring Tahsan Khan, Srabanti Chatterjee and Taskeen Rahman in the leading role.

Films 
 Projapoti (2011)
 Chaya Chobi (2012)
 Taarkata (2014)
 Samraat (2016)
 Jodi Ekdin (2019)

Selected television series
 Mike (2009-2009)
 Graduate (2010-2011)
 Rong (2009-2010)
 Chander Nijer Kono Alo Nei (2011-2011)
 Bachelors The Family
 Idiots
 Game
 Off Screen
 Dost Dushmon
 Noy Choy (2019-2019)
 Post Graduate (2017-2017)
 Family Crisis (2019-2021)
 Hit (2021-)
 Family Crisis Reloaded (2022-)''

Selected television films

References

External links
 
 

1982 births
People from Narsingdi District
Living people
Bangladeshi film directors
Bengali film directors
Dhaka College alumni